The 1987–88 Luxembourg National Division was the 74th season of top level association football in Luxembourg.

Overview
It was performed in 12 teams, and Jeunesse Esch won the championship.

Regular phase

Table

Results

Final phase

Championship play-off

Table

Results

Relegation play-off

Table

Results

References
Luxembourg - List of final tables (RSSSF)

Luxembourg National Division seasons
Lux
1987–88 in Luxembourgian football